Portwood is a surname. Notable people with the surname include:

Amber Portwood (born 1990), American reality television personality
Cliff Portwood (1937–2012), English footballer, singer and television personality
George Portwood (died  1744), English carpenter and architect